Littleworth Common is a  biological Site of Special Scientific Interest west of Farnham Common in Buckinghamshire. It is Common land owned by South Bucks District Council.

The site was formerly open heathland, most of which has developed into birch and oak woodland. Some remnants of acid heathland survive, and marshy areas and two large ponds have uncommon communities, including the nationally rare starfruit. Wet flushes have extensive bog mosses. Purple hairstreak butterfly larvae feed on the oak trees.

There is access from Boveney Wood Lane and Little Road.

References

Sites of Special Scientific Interest in Buckinghamshire
Common land in England
Burnham, Buckinghamshire